Eutropis brevis is a species of skink found in India.

References

Eutropis
Reptiles described in 1875
Reptiles of India
Endemic fauna of India
Taxa named by Albert Günther